The campaign to suppress bandits in northeast China (东北剿匪) was a counterinsurgency operation waged by the Chinese Communist Party against bandits and guerrillas affiliated with the Kuomintang near the end of the Chinese Civil War.

Strategies
Both sides had made grave miscalculations initially, but the Communists were quicker to correct their miscalculation and immediately adjust their strategy to achieve final victory.  The Nationalists, on the other hand, entered the campaign overconfident and did not modify their strategy quickly enough, resulting in their failure. This had serious consequences later on as their communist enemy had successfully stabilized their rear area when winning the campaign.

Nationalist strategy
As when the Nationalists had attempted to fight guerrilla and insurgency warfare against the communists after being driven from mainland China half a decade later, grave strategic mistakes made by the Nationalists contributed as much as if not more than Communist political and military pressure to the Nationalist defeat in the campaign.  The very first strategic mistake made by Chiang Kai-shek and his followers was when they had neither the sufficient troops nor enough transportation assets to be deployed into the Japanese-occupied regions of Northeast China. Unwilling to let these regions falling into communist hands, Chiang's government ordered these bandits to fight communists in any way they could.  This grave strategic miscalculation resulted in alienation and resentment to the Nationalists by the local population, which had already blamed the Nationalists for losing the regions to the Japanese invaders during the war.  However, the bandits were deeply feared and hated by the local populace they plagued for so long, and Nationalist troops left behind joining the bandits certainly did not help them win the support of the general population.  In fact, it served the exact opposite, it caused Chiang's government to lose popular support to the least, if not strengthening the popular support of their communist enemy.

The second grave strategic miscalculation made by the retreating Nationalists was also similar to the one the Nationalists had made when it attempted to simultaneously solve the warlord problem that had plagued China for so long with the problem of the exterminating communists together: Those warlords allied with Chiang's Nationalist regime were only interested in keeping their own power and defected to the Japanese side when Japanese invaders offered to let them keep their power in exchange for their collaborations.  After World War II, these forces of former Japanese puppet regimes once again returned to the Nationalist camp for the same reason they defected to the Japanese invaders. Obviously, it was difficult for Chiang to immediately get rid of these warlords for good as soon as they surrendered to Chiang and rejoined Nationalists, because such move would alienate other factions within the Nationalist ranks, and those bandits and former Japanese puppet regime's warlords could still help the Nationalists to by holding on to what was under their control and fighting off communists, and they and the communists would both be weakened.  Similarly, the bandits Chiang's government had failed to exterminate were obviously not good candidates for neither joining the regular troops nor being honorably discharged, and using them to fight communists appeared to be the only logical alternative.  If the communists were great weakened by the bandits, then it would the Nationalists would have easier time in their counterattacks to retake China.  If the bandits were defeated, then the Nationalists would have easier job to eradicate them later after retaking China.  However, just like those warlords, these bandits were mostly only interested in keeping their own power also, and thus did not put any real efforts to fight the communists like some of the Nationalists who were dedicated to their political cause.  The eradication of bandits by the communist regime only strengthened its popular support since previous governments dating back from Qing Dynasty had failed to do so.

The third grave strategic miscalculation made by the retreating nationalist regime was similar to the second one, but this one was about its own troops left behind during the Second Sino-Japanese War.  The resource strained nationalist government could not provide enough supports to these troops left behind the enemy lines, who were forced to turn to banditry for survival when they were left on their own, and this had alienated many of the troops left behind, and it was impossible to expect them to fight their communist enemy with the same kind of dedication like those nationalist agents who believed in their political cause, or the American trained new forces.  The banditry also alienated the local populace and caused the nationalists to lose popular support.  Compounding the problem, due to the need of bandits' knowledge of local area, and the fact that they were the only pro-nationalist force in the region, they were often rewarded with higher ranks than the highly trained regular nationalist troops sent to Northeast China.  As a result, the regular nationalist troops sent to Northeast China after World War II lacked any willingness to work together with the bandits, especially when many of the bandits were former warlords's troops cooperated with Japanese invaders.  Many loyal nationalists were enraged by the fact that they had to serve under the former-enemy they once fought: in all, Chiang's government awarded bandits with many high military ranks: 32 commander-in-chiefs, 33 army commanders, and 158 division commanders in all.  In contrast, the highly trained regular nationalist army sent to Northeast China after World War II had much fewer similar ranks, meaning that most highly qualified professional officers ranked below bandits.  Meanwhile, the bandits lacked the similar willingness and attempted to expend those nationalist troops whenever they could to save their own skin, and often used the superior ranks Chiang's government given to them as their excuses to ignore correct strategies ordered by the nationalist regular army.

The fourth grave strategic miscalculation made by the Chiang government was financial / economical: due to the lack of money, those bandits turned guerrillas were not sufficiently provided with supplies and money.  The bandits turned guerrilla had no problem of looting the local population to get what they need, as they had done for decades, which inevitably drove the general popular support further into the communist side.  The little financial support provided by the nationalists was simply not enough to support such guerrilla and insurgency warfare on such a large scale, when the country was in desperate need of resources to recover from the devastation of war.  Another unexpected but disastrous result of the insufficient financial support was that it had greatly eroded the support of the nationalists within its own ranks.  The wealthy landowners and businessmen were the strong supporters of Chiang's government and as their properties were confiscated by the communists and redistributed to the poor, their hatred toward the communist regime was enough to cause many of them to stay behind voluntarily to fight behind the enemy line.  However, the landowners and businessmen were also longtime victims of bandits due to their wealth, and suffered even more than the general populace.  As these former landowners and businessmen turned guerrilla fighters were ordered to join their former bandits who once threatened, looted, kidnapped and even killed them and their relatives, it was obvious that such cooperation was in name only and cannot produce any actual benefits, and the alienation and discontent toward the nationalist regime harbored by these once ardent nationalists would only grow greater.

Another problem for the nationalists was the strong disagreement among themselves over how to fight the war against their communist enemy.   While some preferred to fight a total war, incapacitate the enemy's ability to fight, but this inevitably conflicted with the interest of another faction of strong supporters of the nationalist regime: the landowners and businessmen, who joined bandits to oppose such tactic.  The reason was that landowners and businessmen supporting and joining the nationalist guerrilla firmly believed that the nationalists would be able to exterminate the communists within several months and they would be able to regain their lost lands, businesses, and other properties that were confiscated and redistributed to the poor by the communists.  As some of the nationalists suggested and destroyed the production facilities and businesses as part of the total war, the landowners and businessmen would not be able to regain any valuable properties after the return of the nationalist regime because those properties had been destroyed.  The bandits agreed with the businessmen and landowners to oppose the idea of total war for a different reason: when the properties were destroyed and productivity dropped, they would not be able to loot enough supply to survive.  As a result, despite the animosities between the bandits and landowners and businessmen, they were united together in the opposition to those nationalists advocating a total war.  This strategic difference meant that despite being interrupted, the rear area of communists was not destroyed and remained intact so that a continuous supply could be provided for the communists' war efforts, which ultimately led to their final victory.

Communist strategy
Communists, like their nationalist counterparts, also made a grave miscalculation, but in comparison to the nationalists, the communists were very quick in correcting their miscalculation and avoided disasters nationalists had suffered.  The communist miscalculation was only made in the initial stage when they first ventured into Northeast China after World War II: during the start of their Campaign to Establish Communist Base in Northeast China, communists were eager to expand their force in region, but most of the communist force sent to Northeast China did not reach their final destination, especially after the Defense of the Great Wall.  Although the communists managed to send more than 270,000 troops to Northeast China, most of them were contained in Rehe, Chahar, and Suiyuan by the nationalist forces.  Although most of these areas belonged to the communist Northeast China Military Region, the communist force contained there was not much of help in supporting their comrades in the northeast.  The problem of the lack of soldiers was further compounded by the need to enlist troops who knew the local area and as a result, the northeastern communists made a grave miscalculation in concentrating on expanding their numbers by enlist the help of local bandits.  However, the economically deprived communists were obviously no match for the better conditioned nationalists who could provide more resources, and as a result, when the communists begun to abandon large cities in Northeast China in their retreat, most bandits that first temporarily sided with communists defected to the nationalists in battalions and regiments, or even in brigades.  For example, in a single communist base to the north of Changchun alone, over 33,200 former bandit-turned communist troops turned against the communists by the end of December 1945.

Communists responded rapidly to the situation.  At the end of November 1945, communists in the communist base to the north of Changchun held its conference on bandit eradication, and decided to send out communist guerrillas to the regions with weak communist control.  In addition to military operations, the communist guerrillas were also charged with political tasks of mobilizing local populace, especially the lower class peasantry, to fight bandits.  On 2 December 1945, Songjiang communists leaders held a conference for the similar purposes, and decided to stop expanding communist forces purely based on numbers.  Instead, the communist force would be strengthened by political purification.  These two tactics became the foundation bases on which the communist bandit-eradication campaign strategies would later develop, which eventually expanded into three major parts:

The first part was to send a large number of communist cadres to the rural area (eventually totaled over 12,000) to mobilizing the local populace.  Once the local population was rallied to the communist side, the nationalist agents hidden among the local population became increasingly difficult to survive, and the intelligence source of bandits was severed.  In addition, bandits' secret base in remote locations hidden in the forest and mountains were revealed by the local populace, thus cutting off bandits' supply.  The second part was to increase political pressure against the bandits by continuously launching psychological / propaganda / political assaults on the bandits, pressuring them into surrender.  The military part was mainly involved in concentrating force to fight bandits, targeting the largest bands of bandits first, so that when they were exterminated, it would send shockwaves to smaller bands of bandits.  Construction of fortifications was a must to protect the communist controlled area.  Mobile strike force was also a must in pursuing the bandits, and cavalries, troops riding in vehicles and trains were assigned this task.  Land reformed had played a very important role in the eventual communist victory because when the tenant peasants obtained their own land, their support for the communists strengthened.

In accordance with their strategy, communists reorganized their forces.  In Songjiang, Military and Administrative Committee was formed, with Zhang Xiushan (张秀山) as the secretary, and bandit extermination command was also formed, with order to exterminate bandits given.  In Heilongjiang, communists decided to strengthen their control of Keshan, secure Baiquan (拜泉), and then take Yi'an (依安), and finally, relief Dedu (德都) that was under siege.  Communists of other region in Northeast China also made plans to exterminate bandits before the complete withdraw of Red Army.  From 20 to 28 December 1945, Hejiang communists decided on their meetings to exterminate bandits in Yilan (依兰) and Huachuan (桦川) Counties.  To strengthen their force in the campaign, communists deployed regular army from other area, including Shandong 7th Division, 3rd Division of the New Fourth Army, Tiansong (田松) Squadron, and 359th Brigade.  These regular units would fight side by side with the ten thousand member strong communist militia established during the campaign.

Prelude
Due to the grave communist blunder, nationalists had an upper hand in the initial struggle for the control of Northeast China.  Despite being reaching the region before the nationalists could, vast majority portion of the region was dominated by the bandits sided with the nationalists.  Bandits under the command of Ma Yuechuan (马越川) with more than eighteen thousand troops, including artillery and cavalries controlled most of Nenjiang (province), and attacked Martial Art Temple region of (Wu Miao Zi, 武庙子) in Tailai (泰来) county, succeeded in killing the communist commander-in-chief of Tailai (泰来) Military Sub-Region, Zhang Pingyang (张平洋).  The vital communication line between the region to the north of Changchun and south of Changchun was controlled by three thousand bandits headed by Ma Xishan (马喜山) and Zheng Yunfeng (郑云峰). Communist controlled trains were constantly ambushed and the greatest casualties suffered in an ambush exceeded a hundred.  In Hejiang, over twenty thousand bandits under the command of Li Huatang (李华堂) and Xie Wendong (谢文东) struck numerous times, including successfully killing Sun Xilin (孙西林), the communist deputy mayor of Jiamusi.  However, the bandits made a serious blunder when they indiscriminately murdered more than two hundred innocent ethnic Korean civilians in three villages in execution style in Mishan (密山) County, even babies of several weeks old were not spared.  The mass execution and the subsequent burning down of every building in the village had outraged the local populace, and ethnic Koreans in the local area were firmly allied with communists as a result.

In Heilongjiang, the rear area of communists in Northeast China, the bandits were most numerous, totaling more than seventy thousands, all received ranks and titles from Chiang's government because the nationalists planned to use them to harass the rear area of their communist enemy. The largest band of bandits were headed by Shang Qiyue (尚其悦), totaling over ten thousands, struck many time, succeeding raiding communist held areas numerous times. In Yan'an (延安) County, (communist party) secretary Zhao Guang (赵光) was ambushed and killed when he was sent to Tongbei (通北) County. Gu Yanling (顾延岭), the communist chief of Xunke (逊克) County and two squads of communist soldiers totaling eighteen were captured and executed by being buried alive. Communist garrison of Sunwu (孙吴) County totaling forty soldiers were also executed by being buried alive after their capture. However, such brutal execution only strengthened communist resolve to exterminate the bandits to avenge the death of their comrades, which totaled 154 in a single region to the north of Changchun along. Another unexpected consequence of such brutal methods of execution was that the highly disciplined regular nationalist army sent to Northeast China later on was equally outraged with the bandits' behavior like the local populace, and not wanting to be associated with the bandits and thus had their image tarnished, hence they were not enthusiastic in coordinating their military operations with these bandits to fight together against the communists, despite the fact that Chiang's government rewarded most of the bandit chiefs with higher ranks than these nationalist regular army commanders. However, the bandits did enjoy the temporary advantage over the communists, controlling over two-thirds of the total territory. For example, in the region to the north of Changchun, twenty-nine out of sixty-five cities and towns were controlled by bandits, and over two-thirds of the rural area was also in the bandits' hands. In Songjiang, communists were only able to control four towns including Bin (宾) County, Hulan (呼兰), Bayan (巴彦) and Shuangcheng, while for the rest, garrisons of fifteen counties totaling over ten thousand troops defected and joined the bandits. The total number of bandits peaked in December 1945 when they strength exceeded 110,000.

Order of battle
With the exception of the initial stage where communist regular army was involved, most of the campaign was largely fought by the militia and irregular forces.

Nationalists order of battle
Despite rewarding the bandits with military ranks that were often higher than their regular army, the eleven-hundred member strong bandit force in Northeast China was mostly fighting on their own because the regular nationalist army in the south was unwilling to associate themselves with bandits, and thus was not enthusiastic about joining the bandits by fighting along their side.  The strength of various groups of bandits included:
Colonel General Li Huatang (李华堂), commander-in-chief of 1st Army Group of the Northeast Moving Forward Army (totaling 10,000+)
Major General Zhang Bojun 张伯钧
Major General Liu Shandong 刘山东
Colonel General Xie Wendong (谢文东), commander-in-chief of 15th Army Group of the Northeast Moving Forward Army (totaling 10,000+)
Major General Zheng Yunfeng (郑云峰), brigade commander of Moving Forward Army
Major General Sun Rongjiu (孙荣久)
Lieutenant General Zhang Yuxin (张雨新), army commander of the Advanced Army
Lieutenant General Wang Naikang (王乃康), deputy-commander of the Advanced Army
Lieutenant General Jiang Pengfei (姜朋飞), army commander of the Newly Organized 27th Army
Major General Li Mingxin (李明信)
Major General Cui Dagang (崔大刚)
Lieutenant General Ma Yuechuan (马越川), army commander of Northeast Recovery Army (totaling 18,000+)
Colonel General Ma Xishan (马喜山), commander-in-chief of the Advanced Army (totaling 3,000+)
70,000+ bandits in Heilongjiang, including the largest group below:
Lieutenant General Shang Qiyue (尚其悦), army commander of Northeast Recovery Army (totaling 10,000+)

Chinese Communist Party order of battle
In addition to regular army, communists had taken the opportunity to build a strong militia to fight in the campaign, and the total strength exceeded hundred thousand.
Shandong 7th Division
3rd Division of the New Fourth Army
Tiansong (田松) Squadron
359th Brigade
Self-defense Force (militia): over 100,000

Initial phase
Despite the slight numerical and technical superiority over their communist enemy, the bandits were disorganized and mostly fought independently on their own turfs.  The lack of overall cooperation between different groups of bandits was due to their intention to keep their own strength and thus provided the communist enemy with the opportunity to concentrate their forces to defeat them one group at a time.  According to communists, the campaign was divided into two phases, with the initial phase covering the period from November 1945 through April 1946.  At the beginning of this initial phase, communists concentrated on bandits active in the region bounded by Liaoyang in the south and Anshan in the west.  On 28 November 1945, communist force attacked the base of bandits in Thousand Mountains and Seventh Ridge.  After two days of fierce battle, over three thousands of bandits were killed or captured.  The communists then turned their attention to strengthen their control of the troops by forming units which could be absolutely controlled.  Starting at squad level, then to the platoon level, and the next was battalion level, and finally, regimental level.  Once the communists had the absolute control of an entire regiment, the unit was sent out to engage bandit group with larger number.  In the meantime, communist militia was also established in the form of Self-defense Force, which would eventually do the major portion of the fighting.  After communist Shandong 7th Division and 359th Brigade had arrived to in the beginning of February 1946, the local communists strength was further expanded and larger offensives against bandits were launched.

By the end of March 1946, over 212 major offensives against bandits were launched, and all resulted in communist victory.  A total of 78,495 bandits were killed / captured / defected, with over 25,500 repeating rifles, 911 handguns, 52 artillery pieces, and 618 machine guns and other weaponry such as single shot rifles were captured in the process.  As majority of the bandits were annihilated, communists strengthen the control of their rear area and a total of 118 towns / cities formally in the hands of bandits had been taken by the communists.  With the exception of the region to the north of Changchun where over thirty thousand bandits remained active, all bandits in other communist region behind the frontline had been exterminated by March 1946.  On 7 July 1946, communists held a meeting to analyze the situation and issued order to strengthen the popular support and to mobilize the local population via land reform.  Meanwhile, communists decided to take the advantage of the stalemate reached between the nationalists and the communists in Northeast China to launch additional campaigns against the bandits in their area of control.  Communists launched another round of offensive in the region to the north of Changchun and by the end of August 1946, another ten-thousand bandits were annihilated.  On 29 August 1946, communist high command ordered the communist force in Northeast China to use September to prepare for the incoming conflict with regular nationalist army in the south because intelligence indicates that the nationalist force in the south would launch a campaign to destroy the communist base in the northern part of Northeast China.  The communists in Northeast China consequently ordered their regular force to prepare for the income conflict and the task to exterminate bandits was transferred to militias and local garrisons.

Main phase
After communists were forced to give up large cities including Siping, Changchun and Jilin City, the surviving thirty thousand bandits behind the communist frontline had their hope up again and increased their strikes against the communists in the rear.  However, due to the rapid military success, the regular nationalist army was even less enthusiastic in cooperating and joining forces with bandits because they felt that the communists could be defeated without the help from bandits, who would only be a burden to the regular nationalist army for tarnishing their image due to the bandits' notoriety.  Seizing on the opportunity, the communists were quick to exploiting the internal division among nationalist forces and planned another round of offensives.  According to the communist, the main phase of the campaign was period from June 1946 to April 1947. The surviving 30,000 strong bandits were divided into six groups, active in six regions behind the communist frontline:
5,000+ bandits in the region to the south of Harbin and along the Songhua River often struck places including Shuangcheng, Wuchang City, Bin (宾) County, Elm Tree (Yu Shu, 榆树), and Hulan (呼兰).
5,000+ bandits in the region to the west of Liaoyang, often struck places including Daze (大责), Qian'an (乾安) and Forward Flag (Qian Bu Qi, 前部旗). This is only group that actually cooperated with regular nationalist army, acting as the scouts of the latter.
5,000+ bandits active in Nenjiang (province)
5,000+ bandits active in regions to the east of Changchun
In Hejiang, over 40 bands of bandits totaling more than 8,000 had successfully severed the railway from Mudanjiang to Jiamusi by taking counties including Dongning (东宁), Dong'an (东安), Luobei (萝北) and Tongjiang.  Most high ranking commanders of bandits belonged to this group, including Li Huatang (李华堂), Xie Wendong (谢文东), Zhang Yuxin (张雨新), and Sun Rongjiu (孙荣久).
The communist high command in Northeast China decided in June 1946 that it was critical to secure the rear area behind their frontline to concentrate on fighting the regular nationalist army in the front, so the communist force was redeployed to exterminate bandits by concentrating on the major groups first, and then the smaller ones.   In Hejiang, six thousand mobile strike force would first exterminate bandits in the regions of Tongjiang, Luobei (萝北), Fujin (富锦), Yilan (依兰), Peace Town (Tai Ping Zheng, 太平镇) and the regions to the north and the east of Boli (勃利).  Afterward, they would attack bandits in Baoqing (宝清) region in a pincer movement from both the east and the west.  Communist force in Mudanjiang was responsible for exterminating bandits in Dong'an (东安), Mishan (密山), Muling (穆棱) and Dongning (东宁). Communist force in Harbin was responsible for exterminating bandits in regions including Yanshou (延寿), Muohe (沫河), Weihe (苇河), Tonghe (通河), and Fangzheng (方正). The communists planned their offensive in three stages.

During the first stage of their offensive that lasted from June 1946 through the end of August 1946, communists deployed the 717th Regiment and the 719th Regiment of the 359th Brigade to support the local communist force from Hejiang and Mudanjiang Military Regions to attack bandits headed by Xie Wendong (谢文东) in three fronts in the regions of Dong'an (东安) and Mishan, (密山). After two battles, over six thousand bandits were killed while the surviving bandits fled to the region of Baoqing (宝清) and Fujin (富锦). By the end of June, bandits in Dongning (东宁) region headed by Wang Laolin (王老林) were also annihilated. The communists continued their attack eastward from Dong'an (东安) toward Tiger Forest (Hulin, 虎林) and Rao (饶) River regions, annihilating local bandits. Meanwhile, another communist force cross the Wanda (完达) Mountain and with the help of communist force in Hejiang, attacked bandits fled to Baoqing (宝清). On 1 July 1946, in the region of Youtou (尤头) Bridge and Toudaihezi (头道河子), the surviving bandits headed by Xie Wendong (谢文东) was once again defeated. On 3 July 1946, communist Hejiang mobile strike force attacked northward to pursue the 1,400 strong bandit force that fled to the regions of Huachuan (桦川) and Fujin (富锦) and joined the local bandits. After eight days, the bandits were annihilated and by 12 July 1946, 972 bandits were captured alive. Communist subsequently launched intensive political / psychological / propaganda offensives and over 800 surviving surrendered. Huachuan (桦川) and Fujin (富锦) regions were cleared and by the end of August 1946, near ten thousand bandits were killed. In Songjiang, communists in Harbin uncovered a nationalist underground intelligence directly controlled by the bandits and the bandit chiefs including Jiang Pengfei (姜朋飞), Li Mingxin (李明信) and Cui Dagang (崔大刚) were all arrested.

The second stage covers the period from September 1946 through the end of December 1946.  After suffering defeats, the surviving 1,500 bandits headed by Li Huatang (李华堂), Xie Wendong (谢文东), and Zhang Yuxin (张雨新) fled to the region of Yilan (依兰), Boli (勃利), and Linkou (林口) bordered by Songhua River in the north, and Mudanjiang in the west. Communist 359th Brigade and Hejiang and Mudanjiang forces surrounded the above region and after battles at Zi'erlazi (子尔拉子) and Cold Spring (Han He, 寒春) River, over 140 bandits were killed, 654 bandits surrendered and 121 bandits captured. The communists also captured 738 guns, 110 horses, but the biggest gain was the capture of the bandit chiefs: on 20 November 1946, Xie Wendong (谢文东) was captured by the communist and soon after, Zhang Yuxin (张雨新) was captured. On 2 December 1946, Li Huatang (李华堂) was captured in the forest in the region to northwest of Diaoling (刁翎).  In Songjiang, over four thousands bandits were annihilated from early October through 22 November 1946. In the region to the west of Changchun, five thousand bandits headed by Wang Naikang (王乃康) were annihilated by mid-December. In the region to the east of Changchun, after 600 bandits were killed, sixteen groups of bandits surrendered to the communists without a fight.

The third and last stage in the main phase of the campaign covers the period from January 1947 through April 1947, during which the bandit chief Sun Jiurong (孙荣久) was captured on 26 March 1947 in Hejiang. In March and April 1947, communist force in Longjiang took the last four bandit strongholds at Huma (呼玛), Oupu (欧浦) Black Cloud (Wuyun, 乌云), and Muohe (漠河). Over seven thousand bandits were killed, including their chiefs Zhang Bojun (张伯钧) and Liu Shandong (刘山东).  By April 1947, the communist victory was complete and the area behind the frontline was cleared of bandits. As a result of their victory, communists had firmly established themselves in Northeast China when their bases in the rear area there were secured and strengthened, which was critical in the victory in Northeast China.

Outcome
Although sharing the common anticommunist goal, the nationalist guerrilla and insurgency warfare was largely handicapped by the enlistment of bandits, and with the lack of active military support of the highly trained nationalist regular army sent to Northeast China after World War II and the unconditional political and financial support of Chiang's government, the communists successfully eradicated bandits turned nationalist guerrillas in Northeast China.  Riding on their success, the communist immediately launched Summer Offensive of 1947 in Northeast China against nationalists.  The experienced learned in the campaign also helped the communists half a decade later in other counterinsurgency / counter guerrilla campaign campaigns against bandits turned guerrillas allied with nationalists after the communist revolution in China.

See also

 Campaign to Suppress Bandits in Wuping
 Campaign to suppress bandits in southwestern China
 Campaign to Suppress Bandits in Eastern China
List of battles of the Chinese Civil War
National Revolutionary Army
History of the People's Liberation Army
Chinese Civil War

References

Zhu, Zongzhen and Wang, Chaoguang, Liberation War History, 1st Edition, Social Scientific Literary Publishing House in Beijing, 2000,  (set)
Zhang, Ping, History of the Liberation War, 1st Edition, Chinese Youth Publishing House in Beijing, 1987,  (pbk.)
Jie, Lifu, Records of the Liberation War: The Decisive Battle of Two Kinds of Fates, 1st Edition, Hebei People's Publishing House in Shijiazhuang, 1990,  (set)
Literary and Historical Research Committee of the Anhui Committee of the Chinese People's Political Consultative Conference, Liberation War, 1st Edition, Anhui People's Publishing House in Hefei, 1987, 
Li, Zuomin, Heroic Division and Iron Horse: Records of the Liberation War, 1st Edition, Chinese Communist Party History Publishing House in Beijing, 2004, 
Wang, Xingsheng, and Zhang, Jingshan, Chinese Liberation War, 1st Edition, People's Liberation Army Literature and Art Publishing House in Beijing, 2001,  (set)
Huang, Youlan, History of the Chinese People's Liberation War, 1st Edition, Archives Publishing House in Beijing, 1992, 
Liu Wusheng, From Yan'an to Beijing: A Collection of Military Records and Research Publications of Important Campaigns in the Liberation War, 1st Edition, Central Literary Publishing House in Beijing, 1993, 
Tang, Yilu and Bi, Jianzhong, History of Chinese People's Liberation Army in Chinese Liberation War, 1st Edition, Military Scientific Publishing House in Beijing, 1993 – 1997,  (Volum 1), 7800219615 (Volum 2), 7800219631 (Volum 3), 7801370937 (Volum 4), and 7801370953 (Volum 5)

1945 in China
1946 in China
1947 in China
Campaigns of the Chinese Civil War
Conflicts in 1945
Conflicts in 1946
Conflicts in 1947